, also known as Ryuzo 7, is a 2015 Japanese action comedy film directed by Takeshi Kitano. It was released on April 25, 2015.

Plot
Ryuzo (Tatsuya Fuji) is a retired yakuza gangster who lives a quiet unassuming life with his salaryman son, Ryuhei (Masanobu Katsumura). Still in contact with his former lieutenant, Masa (Masaomi Kondō), Ryuzo maintains his short temper with their regular get-togethers. One day, the old gangster receives a call from an impostor pretending to be his son asking for ¥5 million. Ryūzō sees through the trick and learns from police detective Murakami (Beat Takeshi) that a member from the Keihin Rengo gang is responsible. Re-uniting his seven former henchmen to strike back, Ryūzō learns that they have all grown weak with their old age. The elderly yakuza members soon learn that they must overcome their weaknesses if they are to prove to be a match against the younger Keihin Rengo.

Cast
Tatsuya Fuji as Ryuzo
Masaomi Kondō as Masa
Akira Nakao as Mokichi
Tōru Shinagawa as Mac
Ben Hiura as Ichizō
Kōjun Itō as Hide
Ken Yoshizawa as Taka
Akira Onodera as Yasu
Masanobu Katsumura as Ryuhei
Hisako Manda as Hostess
Beat Takeshi as Murakami
Ken Yasuda as Nishi

Reception
The film earned  on its opening weekend in Japan. In a review for The Japan Times, Mark Schilling applauded Tatsuya Fuji for his performance of Ryuzo, stating, "Though looking every one of his 74 real-life years, Fuji brings a volatile energy to proceedings that would otherwise be merely absurd... when he starts raging against the dying of the light, look out for flying debris — and prepare to laugh."

References

External links
 

2015 action comedy films
Films directed by Takeshi Kitano
Japanese action comedy films
Yakuza films
2015 comedy films
2010s Japanese films